The 2001 World Single Distance Speed Skating Championships were held between 9 and 11 March 2001 in the Utah Olympic Oval.

Schedule

Medal summary

Men's events

Women's events

Medal table

References

2001 World Single Distance
World Single Distance Speed Skating Championships
World Single Distance, 2001
World Single Distance Speed Skating
World Single Distance Speed Skating Championships